The 2019 Sun Belt women's basketball tournament was the postseason women's basketball tournament for the Sun Belt Conference that occurred from March 11 to March 16, 2019, at the Lakefront Arena in New Orleans. Little Rock won the conference tournament championship game over South Alabama, 57–56.

Seeds

Schedule

Bracket

See also
2019 Sun Belt Conference men's basketball tournament

References

External links
 2019 Sun Belt Women's Basketball Championship

Sun Belt Conference women's basketball tournament
2018–19 Sun Belt Conference women's basketball season
Sun Belt Conference Women's B